Diggi Loo, Diggi Ley is the debut studio album by Herreys, released in 1984. The most notable song on the album is "Diggi-Loo Diggi-Ley", which won the Eurovision Song Contest 1984.

Track listing 
 "Diggi-Loo Diggi-Ley"
 "Kom loss" ("Footloose")
 "Inget som hindrar mig" ("Break My Stride")
 "Är det sant"
 "Om vi möts igen"
 "Manhattan"
 "Mitt hjärta slår samma slag"
 "Mirror Mirror upon the Wall"
 "Kom och ta mig"
 "Every Song You Sing"
 "Kall som is"
 "Vill inte dansa mer"

Charts

References

External links 

 

1984 debut albums
Herreys albums
Mariann Grammofon albums